St. Barbe is a defunct provincial electoral district for the House of Assembly of Newfoundland and Labrador, Canada. As of 2011, there were 7,064 eligible voters living within the district. The district was abolished in 2015 and replaced by St. Barbe-L'Anse aux Meadows.

An area along the west coast of the Great Northern Peninsula, the district has significant economic disparity among various communities. While most of the towns with Gros Morne National Park, and the Town of Port Saunders, which is a government service centre have fared very well economically, other towns such as Bird Cove have lost more than 50% of their population since the 1992 cod moratorium. 

The tourist season runs from late May until late October. While the principal tourism driver is Gros Morne National Park, the season continues into late October as this is a popular big game hunting destination for primarily US hunters. Up to a dozen big game outfitters operate from the area employing hundreds of guides, cooks and others. The area has fish processing plants in Woody Point, Rocky Harbour, Cow Head, River of Ponds, Port au Choix, New Ferrole and Black Duck Cove. Various species including shrimp, turbot and crab are processed locally, while many other species such as lobster, herring, mackerel and halibut are shipped out with little to no processing done.

It included the communities of St. Barbe, Bartlett's Harbour, Bellburns, Bird Cove, Black Duck Cove, Blue Cove, Brig Bay, Castor River North, Castor River South, Cow Head, Daniel's Harbour, Eddie's Cove West, Forrester’s Point, Glenburnie-Birchy Head-Shoal Brook, Hawke's Bay, New Ferrole, Norris Point, Parsons Pond, Pigeon Cove, Plum Point, Pond Cove, Port aux Choix, Port Saunders, Portland Creek, Reef's Harbour, River of Ponds, Rocky Harbour St. Pauls, Sally's Cove, Shoal Cove West, Three Mile Rock, Trout River, Wiltondale, Woody Point.

Members of the House of Assembly

St. Barbe North

St. Barbe South

Election results

|-

|-

|-
 
|NDP
|Diane Ryan
|align="right"|437
|align="right"|10.84%
|align="right"|
|}

|-

|-

|-
 
|NDP
|B. Gary Noel
|align="right"|196
|align="right"|4.62%
|align="right"|
|}

|-

|-

|-
 
|NDP
|Holly Patey
|align="right"|293
|align="right"|6.08
|align="right"|
|}

References

External links 
Website of the Newfoundland and Labrador House of Assembly

Newfoundland and Labrador provincial electoral districts